Hector Donald (or David) Gillespie (29 May 1901 – 12 October 1954) 
was a New Zealand cricketer who played first class cricket for Auckland and briefly for a pre-Test status New Zealand international side between 1920 and 1932 as a right-handed batsman.

Life and career
Educated at Auckland Grammar School, Gillespie made 1,208 runs from his thirty first-class matches at 23.23, including one century – 183 against Canterbury in January 1930. He also made six half-centuries, and took two wickets for 35.50 with his occasional bowling. He toured Australia with the New Zealand team in 1925-26 but played in only one of the four first-class matches.
 
He captained Eden Cricket Club in Auckland for some years; in 1924–25 he shared a 441-run opening partnership with Jackie Mills for Eden against University. He was also an avid rugby player.

He went on to become a justice of the peace after a 38-year career in law.

See also
 List of Auckland representative cricketers

Footnotes

Notes

External links
 
 

1901 births
1954 deaths
Cricketers from Auckland
Auckland cricketers
New Zealand cricketers
Pre-1930 New Zealand representative cricketers
People educated at Auckland Grammar School